Youth Of China is a 1937 patriotic film directed by Wong Tat-Tsoi. Starring Cho-Fan Ng (zh), Gao Luquan, Lau Kuai-Hong (zh), Wu Mei Lun (zh), Siu-Hing Wong (黄笑馨), Yan-Fu Yip (叶仁甫).

References

1937 films
Hong Kong drama films